Grates nunc omnes is the title and first three words of the Latin sequence for Midnight Mass at Christmas.

History
It dates from the 11th century and first appears in a troparion from Regensburg dating to 1030. It belongs to a set of sequences which fell out of use in the official Roman Catholic liturgy after the Council of Trent.

The 'Grates nunc omnes' sequence was also used for communion and as a processional song. In the 14th century a custom developed of linking sequences with German-language responsorial stanzas. The leise 'Lovet sistu Ihesu Crist' is first documented in a Middle Low German manuscript of 1380 from the Cistercian monastery at Medingen. Martin Luther used this and six more verses to create his Christmas hymn Gelobet seist du, Jesu Christ (EG 23, GL 252).

Text and translations

Bibliography 
  Hansjakob Becker and others (ed.): Geistliches Wunderhorn. Große deutsche Kirchenlieder. C. H. Beck, München 2001, S. 69–75.

References

External links 
  Full text of Gelobet seist du, Jesu Christ
  Gelobet seist du, Jesu Christ. In: Populäre und traditionelle Lieder. Historisch-kritisches Liederlexikon of the Deutsche Volksliedarchiv

Christmas carols